Jock Turner (3 March 1909 – 7 March 1935) was an Australian rules footballer who played with Essendon in the Victorian Football League (VFL). He was killed in a motorcycle accident in Yallourn.

Notes

External links 

1909 births
1935 deaths
Australian rules footballers from Victoria (Australia)
Essendon Football Club players
Motorcycle road incident deaths
Road incident deaths in Victoria (Australia)